Esta is a feminine given name which may refer to:

 Esta Charkham (born 1949), British television and film producer and casting director
 Esta Henry (1883–1963), eccentric Scottish antiques dealer 
 Esta Nambayo (born 1968), Ugandan lawyer and judge
 Esther Esta Nesbitt (1918–1975), American illustrator, xerox artist, filmmaker, and educator
 Esta Soler (born 1947), American social activist
 Esta Spalding, American author, screenwriter and poet
 Esta Sterneck, Austrian molecular biologist
 Esta TerBlanche (born 1973), South African actress

Feminine given names